The Antananarivo–Toamasina toll highway is a toll highway under construction in Madagascar that will connect the Malagasy capital of Antananarivo with the port city of Toamasina. Construction, overseen by Egyptian firm Samcrete, began in December 2022 and is expected to cost $1 billion over four years to build. Tolls for passenger cars will be 15,000 Malagasy ariary, while tolls for heavy trucks will be 20,000 ariary.

Construction 
The construction, which began in December 2022, is expected to take four years from start to completion and is expected to cost about $1 billion. Samcrete, an Egyptian engineering and construction firm that has operations across Africa and the Middle East, is in charge of executing the construction project. Construction for the toll highway take place in stages, the first of which is expected to be completed by the end of 2023.

Route information and tolls 
Upon completion, the highway will have its western terminus in Tsarasaotra, Anjozorobe, and its eastern terminus in Toamasina. Along the way, from west-to-east, the highway will pass through Sabotsy Namehana, Ambohimanga Rova, Talata Volonondry, Talata Volonondry, Anjozorobe, and Andaingo en route to Toamasina. The toll road will intersect with Route nationale 4, where an interchange will be constructed, and will join Route nationale 44 along its route.

The route will be a toll road; light vehicles will be charged a toll of 15,000 Malagasy ariary, while heavy trucks will be charged a toll of 20,000 ariary.

Projected impact 
The road is designed to be a faster and shorter alternative to Route nationale 2 and aims to serve as a strategic economic investment that connects Madagascar's capital with its largest seaport. Gasoline consumption along the toll road is also expected to be lower than existing routes between the two cities; a typical passenger car is only expected to consume  of gasoline when traversing the length of the new road, and a heavy truck is expected to consume only .

See also 

 Driving in Madagascar

References 

Roads in Madagascar
Toll roads